Las Orquídeas National Natural Park (Spanish: Parque Nacional Natural Las Orquídeas or PNN Las Orquídeas) is a national park in the Cordillera Occidental, Colombia. Established in 1974, the park encompasses  on the western slopes of Colombia's Cordillera Occidental.

The park covers a large elevational range (300–3,450 m). The climate is generally humid with an annual rainfall of 3,000-4,000 mm, dropping to 2,500 mm at highest elevations, and ranges from tropical lowland to alpine. The range in elevation and climate creates a diversity of plant communities, including lowland rainforest (ca. 300–1,000 m), premontane forest (ca. 1,000–2,000 m), montane forest (ca. 2,000–3,200 m), and high-elevation páramo grassland (ca. 3,200–3,450 m).

References 

National parks of Colombia
Nature reserves in Colombia
Protected areas established in 1974
1974 establishments in Colombia
Northwestern Andean montane forests
Chocó–Darién moist forests